Popowia pauciflora is a species of plant in the family Annonaceae. It is a tree endemic to Peninsular Malaysia.

References

pauciflora
Endemic flora of Peninsular Malaysia
Trees of Peninsular Malaysia
Critically endangered plants
Taxonomy articles created by Polbot